Dr. I. M. Muthanna was a noted Indian writer, scholar and translator; he wrote in English, Kannada and Kodava takk and studied history, folklore and international studies. He was born in Kodagu into the Kodava (Coorg) community. He spent part of his later life in the US.

Some of the books that he wrote are listed below:

A tiny model state of South India (in 1953)
Indo-Ethiopian relations for centuries (in 1961)
Muttaṇṇana kavanagaḷu (Kannada anthology in 1962)
History of Karnataka: history, administration & culture (in 1962)
General Cariappa: (the first Indian commander-in-chief) (in 1964)
The Coorg memoirs (the story of the Kodavas): Muthanna speaks out (in 1971),
General Thimmayya (former: Chief of Army Staff, India; Chairman, N.N.R.C., Korea; Commander, U.N. Forces, Cyprus) (in 1972),
People of India in North America (part one) (in 1975),
Karnataka, history, administration & culture (in 1977)
Tipu Sultan x'rayed (in 1980),
People of India in North America (United States, Canada, W. Indies, & Fiji): immigration history of East-Indians up to 1960 (in 1982),
Koḍava Kannaḍa nighaṇṭu : Koḍava takk nighaṇṭ (Kodava-Kannada dictionary in 1983),
Mother Besant and Mahatma Gandhi (in 1986),
Kodavas & their gala "lela": Kodava folklores & songs (in 1987)

References

Main sources
Jagathigonde Kodagu, by K P Muththanna, 1969.
Kodavas, by B D Ganapathy, 1980.
A study of the Origin of Coorgs, by Lt Col K C Ponnappa (Rtd), 1999.

Poets from Karnataka
Indian male poets
20th-century Indian translators
Kodava people
Kodava Takk